The Seafarers International Union of Puerto Rico, Caribbean and Latin America (SIUPRCLA) is a labor union of mariners. SIUPRCLA is an affiliate union of Seafarers International Union.

In 1998, the United States Department of Labor obtained a consent order requiring SIUPRCLA "to repay $374,729, plus interest, to its welfare plan as repayment for improperly retained employer contributions owed to the welfare plan."

Presidents
 Keith Terpe (1970–1981)
 Jorge L. Cruz (current)

See also

Seafarers International Union
Michael Sacco
Paul Hall (labor leader)

References

External links
SIU Canada website

Trade unions established in 1938
Seafarers' trade unions
Seafarers International Union of North America
Trade unions in Puerto Rico
Latin America and the Caribbean